is a Japanese footballer. He is a defensive midfielder who plays for J2 League side Fagiano Okayama.

Early career 
He was educated at the Kashima Antlers Junior Youth team and played for Yachiyo High School and Senshu University before moving to Singapore in 2017.

Club career

Albirex Niigata Singapore FC 
Yanagi signed his first professional contract with Albirex Niigata Singapore FC, a satellite team of J.League side Albirex Niigata, playing in the top tier of football in Singapore, the S.League.

Yanagi's stellar performances for the White Swans earned him a spot in the Singapore Selection side that took on Selangor FA in the annual Sultan of Selangor's Cup.

During the September international break, he was selected to participate in a week-long training stint with his parent club. He traveled to Niigata prefecture with club captain Shuto Inaba and the duo trained with the first team, playing in a training match against Iwaki FC, a non-J League team.

He played a total of 22 league games for the White Swans and scored 2 goals as they claimed the quadruple for the second consecutive year. His importance for the team is highlighted in the fact that he White Swans’ only two losses came when he was not on the field.

Albirex Niigata 
Following his stellar performances for the White Swans' satellite club, Yanagi was given a chance to prove himself and has joined the White Swans' parent club for the upcoming J-League Two season.

Tochigi SC 
In 2020, it was originally registered with Albirex Niigata. However, on 11 February, he joined Tochigi SC with a one-year loan transfer.On 16 December of the same year, he scored his sixth goal of the season against JEF United Chiba in Matchweek 41. This was the first J-League goal scored at Kanseki Stadium Tochigi, where the J.League official game was held for the first time on the same day.On 29 December 2020, Yanagi permanently transfer to Tochigi SC after loan from Albirex Niigata has been expired.

Fagiano Okayama 
On 6 January 2022, Yanagi joined to J2 club, Fagiano Okayama from Tochigi SC as a permanent transfer after playing the full 90 minutes of 42 matches in the J2 League with Tochigi SC.On 29 October of same year, he failed to advance to the final of the J1 promotion playoffs after his club lost to Montedio Yamagata by 0–3.

Career statistics
Update; end of the 2022 season.

Honours

Club 
Albirex Niigata Singapore
 S.League: 2017
 Singapore Cup: 2017
 Singapore League Cup: 2017
 Singapore Community Shield: 2017

References

External links

Profile at Albirex Niigata
Profile at Fagiano Okayama

1994 births
Living people
Japanese footballers
Singapore Premier League players
Albirex Niigata Singapore FC players
J2 League players
Albirex Niigata players
Tochigi SC players
Fagiano Okayama players
Association football midfielders